Eugeniusz Horbaczewski (28 September 1917 – 18 August 1944) was a Polish fighter pilot, a flying ace of World War II, also known as "Dziubek" (the diminutive of 'the beak' in Polish). According to official lists, Horbaczewski was the third highest scoring Polish fighter ace, with 16.5 confirmed kills (16 individual and one shared) and one probable kill. He was awarded several decorations, among others  Virtuti Militari IV class (posthumously) and V class, four times Polish Cross of Valour, Distinguished Service Order (posthumously) and Distinguished Flying Cross (twice).

Biography
Horbaczewski was born in Kiev, but grew up in Brest. At school, he completed a gliding course. In 1938 he entered cadet flying school in Dęblin, from which he graduated in 1939.

During the Invasion of Poland in 1939 he was made a Podporucznik (2nd Lieutenant) but he saw no combat. He was evacuated through Romania, Yugoslavia and Greece to France. Still without a combat assignment he was then evacuated in 27 June 1940 to Britain.

After training on RAF aircraft, on 21 August 1941 he was posted to the Polish No. 303 Squadron, flying the Spitfire Mk.V. He probably shot down his first aircraft, a Messerschmitt Bf 109 fighter, on 6 November over France. His first confirmed kill was a Focke-Wulf Fw 190 on 4 April 1942. He shot down a Bf 109 on 16 April and a Fw 190 on 19 August.

In February 1943 he volunteered for the Polish Fighting Team, also known as the "Skalski's Circus", attached to the Desert Air Force. Fighting from March 1943 in the Tunisia Campaign, the flight were attached to No. 145 Squadron RAF. On 28 March he shot down a Junkers Ju 88, then four Bf 109's (on 2 April, 6 April, and two on 22 April). On 6 April his Spitfire Mk.IX was hit and started burning, but as he prepared to jump the wind extinguished the fire and he managed to land on an airfield.

Remaining in Africa after the Flight was disbanded he was transferred to No. 601 Squadron, prior to becoming a flight commander in No. 43 Squadron RAF. He commanded the flight from May 1943 then in August he became a Squadron Leader (being one of three Poles commanding British squadrons). He fought with No. 43 squadron over Malta, Sicily and Italy. On 4 September he shot down a Fw 190 and on 16 September two more. In October he handed over command and returned to Britain.

On 16 February 1944 Horbaczewski took command of the Polish No. 315 Squadron, flying the new P-51 Mustang Mk. III. On 12 June 1944 he shot down a Fw 190, and on 30 July one Bf 109 individually and one with his wing man (counted as 0.5 'share'). During this period, he also shot down four V-1 flying bombs.

Death
On 18 August 1944 Horbaczewski led his squadron of 12 aircraft over France on a 'Rodeo' mission, despite being ill with flu. The squadron, using the element of surprise, attacked a group of 60 Fw 190s of Jagdgeschwaders 2 and 26 over an airfield near Beauvais. Horbaczewski quickly shot down three Focke-Wulfs, but went missing during the dogfight. In 1947, the wreck of his Mustang with his body was found crashed near Velennes (Oise).

Exact circumstances are unclear; he was probably shot down in combat by an aircraft of II./JG 26. The squadron was credited with shooting down 16 aircraft in this encounter, with their only loss being the squadron leader (according to German documents, eight Fw 190 of JG 26 and four of JG 2 were destroyed).

See also
List of solved missing person cases

Awards
 Virtuti Militari IV class (posthumously)
 Virtuti Militari V class
 Cross of Valour (Poland) 4 times
 Distinguished Service Order (posthumously)
 Distinguished Flying Cross (United Kingdom) and bar

References

External links 

 WW II Ace Stories - Eugeniusz "Dziubek" Horbaczewski and his Last Battle

Bibliography
 Tadeusz Jerzy Krzystek, Anna Krzystek: Polskie Siły Powietrzne w Wielkiej Brytanii w latach 1940-1947 łącznie z Pomocniczą Lotniczą Służbą Kobiet (PLSK-WAAF). Sandomierz: Stratus, 2012, p. 225. 
 Jerzy Pawlak: Absolwenci Szkoły Orląt: 1925-1939. Warszawa: Retro-Art, 2009, p. 234. 
 Piotr Sikora: Asy polskiego lotnictwa. Warszawa: Oficyna Wydawnicza Alma-Press. 2014, pp. 167–173. 
 Grzegorz Śliżewski, Grzegorz Sojda: Cyrk Skalskiego. Przyczynek do monografii. Warszawa: ZP Grupa Sp. z o.o., 2009 
 Józef Zieliński: Asy polskiego lotnictwa. Warszawa: Agencja lotnicza ALTAIR, 1994, pp. 12–13. ISBN 83862172.

1917 births
1944 deaths
20th-century Polish people
Aerial disappearances of military personnel in action
Formerly missing people
Polish World War II flying aces
Polish World War II pilots
Polish military personnel killed in World War II
Companions of the Distinguished Service Order
Recipients of the Gold Cross of the Virtuti Militari
Recipients of the Distinguished Flying Cross (United Kingdom)
Recipients of the Cross of Valour (Poland)
Aviators killed by being shot down
Polish expatriates in Ukraine
Military personnel from Kyiv
Royal Air Force personnel killed in World War II
Royal Air Force squadron leaders
Missing in action of World War II